Former American President George W. Bush is widely known to use nicknames to refer to journalists, fellow politicians, and members of his White House staff.

Family

Foreign leaders

Staff

Politicians

Journalists

Others

See also

 List of nicknames used by Donald Trump 
 List of nicknames of presidents of the United States
 Lists of nicknames – nickname list articles on Wikipedia

References

External links

Nicknames
Lists of 21st-century people
Lists of nicknames